The 87th Regiment of Foot was a line infantry regiment of the British Army. It was raised to help garrison the West Indies during the American Revolutionary War.

History
The regiment was raised at Bromsgrove in Worcestershire by George Waldegrave in July 1779. It was despatched to the Leeward Islands under the command of Lieutenant-colonel George Finch, 9th Earl of Winchilsea, arriving in January 1780. It returned home in 1783 at the end of hostilities and was disbanded at Coventry in April that year.

References

Military units and formations established in 1779
Military units and formations disestablished in 1783
Infantry regiments of the British Army
Regiments of the British Army in the American Revolutionary War